Benita Hume (14 October 1907 – 1 November 1967) was an English theatre and film actress. She appeared in more than 40 films between 1925 and 1955.

Life and career
She was married to film actor Ronald Colman from 1938 to his death in 1958; they were the parents of a daughter, Juliet. She starred with Colman in both versions of the situation comedy The Halls of Ivy, an NBC Radio programme (1950–1952) and a CBS Television show (1954–1955). She also made occasional guest appearances with her husband on The Jack Benny Show on radio, where the Colmans were portrayed as Benny's long-suffering next-door neighbours, a role they reprised once on his television show. 

After Colman's death, she married actor George Sanders in 1959 and they remained together until her death in 1967. Sanders originally was signed to play Sheridan Whiteside in the musical Sherry! but when Hume became terminally ill with cancer, he withdrew from the project. Hume died in Kent from bone cancer, aged  60.

Filmography

Film credits

 The Happy Ending (1925) as Miss Moon
 Second to None (1927) as Ina
 The Constant Nymph (1928) as Antonia Sanger
 Easy Virtue (1928) as Telephone Receptionist (uncredited)
 Balaclava (1928) as Jean McDonald
 A South Sea Bubble (1928) - Averil Rochester
 A Light Woman (1928) as Dolores de Vargas
 The Lady of the Lake (1928) as The Lady of the Lake
 High Treason (1929) as Evelyn Seymour
 The Clue of the New Pin (1929) as Ursula Ardfern
 The Wrecker (1929) as Mary Shelton
 The House of the Arrow (1930) as Betty Harlow
 Symphony in Two Flats (1930) as Lesley Fullerton (UK version)
 The Flying Fool (1931) as Marion Lee
 A Honeymoon Adventure (1931) as Eve Martin
 The Happy Ending (1931) as Yvonne
 Service for Ladies (1932) as Countess Ricardi
 Women Who Play (1932) as Margaret Sones
 Help Yourself (1932) as Mary Lamb
 Diamond Cut Diamond (1932) as Marda Blackett
 Men of Steel (1932) as Audrey Paxton
 Sally Bishop (1932) as Evelyn Standish
 Lord Camber's Ladies (1932) as Janet King
 Discord (1933) as Phil Stenning
 The Little Damozel (1933) as Sybil Craven
 Clear All Wires! (1933) as Kate
 Looking Forward (1933) as Mrs. Isobel Service
 Gambling Ship (1933) as Eleanor La Velle
 Only Yesterday (1933) as Phyllis Emerson
 The Worst Woman in Paris? (1933) as Margaret Ann 'Peggy' Vane
 The Private Life of Don Juan (1934) as Dona Dolores, a Lady of Mystery
 Jew Suss (1934) as Marie Auguste
 18 Minutes (1935) as Lady Phyllis Pilcott
 The Divine Spark (1935) as Giuditta Pasta
 The Gay Deception (1935) as Miss Channing
 The Garden Murder Case (1936) as Nurse Beeton
 Moonlight Murder (1936) as Diana
 Suzy (1936) as Diane Eyrelle
 Tarzan Escapes (1936) as Rita Parker
 Rainbow on the River (1936) as Julia Layton
 The Last of Mrs. Cheyney (1937) as Kitty Wynton
 Peck's Bad Boy with the Circus (1938) as Myrna Daro

Television credits
 Four Star Playhouse (1953) as Mrs. Bosanquent
 The Halls of Ivy (1954–1955) as Victoria Cromwell 'Vicky' Hall (final appearance)

Selected stage credits
 London Life by Arnold Bennett (1924)
 Chance Acquaintance by John Van Druten (1927)

References

External links

1907 births
1967 deaths
Deaths from bone cancer
English film actresses
English silent film actresses
Deaths from cancer in England
Actresses from London
20th-century English actresses
British expatriate actresses in the United States